The McAllister Hotel was a ten-story high-rise hotel in Downtown Miami, Florida. It opened on December 31, 1919, and until 1925, was the tallest building in Miami. The McAllister Hotel is considered one of Miami's first skyscrapers and was a city icon until its demolition. It was designed by Walter De Garmo. The architect was Frank Valentine Newell.

Notes

Hotel buildings completed in 1917
Buildings and structures demolished in 1988
Demolished hotels in Florida
History of Miami
Skyscraper hotels in Miami
Demolished buildings and structures in Miami
1917 establishments in Florida
1988 disestablishments in Florida